HMS Falcon was a 10-gun  built for the Royal Navy during the 1810s. She was sold in 1838.

Description
The ship's tonnage was 236 76/94 tons burthen. The Cherokee class was armed with two 6-pounder cannon and eight 18-pounder carronades. The ships had a crew of 52 officers and ratings.

Construction and career
Falcon, the fifteenth ship of her name to serve in the Royal Navy, was ordered on 13 June 1817, laid down in May 1818 at Pembroke Dockyard, Wales, and launched on 10 June 1820. She was completed on 3 August 1820 at Plymouth Dockyard.

Notes

References

Cherokee-class brig-sloops
1820 ships
Ships built in Pembroke Dock